The commune of Mutumba is a commune of Karuzi Province in central Burundi. The capital lies at Mutumba.

References

Communes of Burundi
Karuzi Province